ICRA, the International Center for Relativistic Astrophysics is an international research institute for relativistic astrophysics and related areas. Its members are seven Universities and four organizations. The center is located in Rome, Italy.

The International Center for Relativistic Astrophysics (ICRA) was founded in 1985 by Remo Ruffini (University of Rome "La Sapienza") together with Riccardo Giacconi (Nobel Prize for Physics 2002), Abdus Salam (Nobel Prize for Physics 1979), Paul Boyton (University of Washington), George Coyne (former director of the Vatican observatory), Francis Everitt (Stanford University), Fang Li-Zhi (University of Science and Technology of China). It became a legal entity in 1991 with the Ministerial Decree 22/11/1991 from the Ministry of Education, Universities and Research.In 1978 Fang was assigned to host Ruffini, a guest of the Chinese Academy of Sciences. They gave joint university lectures and developed a profound friendship. In 1981 in China they published a small book introducing relativistic astrophysics that became revered among astrophysics students. In 1982 Fang and Ruffini organized the first international conference on astrophysics in China—the third Marcel Grossmann Meeting—and thereafter remained organizers of the Grossmann meetings. Together with Abdus Salam, Riccardo Giacconi, George Coyne, and Francis Everitt, they founded the International Center for Relativistic Astrophysics (ICRA) in 1985. Physics TodayThe International Center of Relativistic Astrophysics is located in the Department of Physics building at the main Campus of the University of Rome "Sapienza".

In 2005 ICRA has been among the founders of ICRANet, the International Center for Relativistic Astrophysics Network. The national activities of research and teaching in Italy remained operative at ICRA in Rome, while international activities and coordination are now based in ICRANet in Pescara.

Structure
President: Yu Wang

Former President: Remo Ruffini

ICRA Council:

Paolo De Bernardis, University of Rome Sapienza

Francis Everitt, Stanford University

Josè Gabriel Funes, Vatican Observatory

Remo Ruffini, ICRANet

Robert Williams, Space Telescope Science Institute

Member institutions
International Centre For Theoretical Physics (ICTP) - Trieste (Italy)

Space Telescope Institute - Baltimore - Maryland - (USA)

Specola Vaticana - Castelgandolfo (Vatican City)

Stanford University - Stanford, California (USA)

University Campus Bio-Medico of Rome (Italy)

University of Science and Technology of China (China)

University of Insubria (Italy)

University of Rome "Sapienza" (Italy)

University of Udine (Italy)

University of Washington at Seattle (USA)

World Academy of Sciences (TWAS) - Trieste (Italy)

International collaboration
Collaboration agreements have been signed between ICRA and scientific institutions worldwide, in particular:

AIGRC (The Australian International Gravitational Research Centre), Australia

ARSEC (Astrophysical Research center for the Structure and Evolution of the Cosmos), South Korea

BAO (Beijing Astronomical Observatory), China

CECS (Centro de Estudios Cientificos de Santiago), Chile

Universidad Nacional de Colombia, Colombia

IHES (Institut Hautes Etudes Scientifiques), France

KSNU (Kyrgiz State National University), Kyrgyzstan

IPM (Keldysh Institute for Applied Mathematics), Russia

MEPhI (Moscow State Engineering Physics Institute), Russia

NCST (National Centre for Science and Technology), Vietnam

OCA (Côte d’Azur Observatory), France

PAO (Pyongyang Astronomical Observatory), North Korea

University of Tirana, Albania

YITP (Yukawa Institute for Theoretical Physics), Japan

UADP (Physics Department, University of Arizona), USA

IRAP PhD
Since 2002, ICRA co-organizes an International Ph.D. program in Relativistic Astrophysics - International Relativistic Astrophysics Ph.D. Program, IRAP-PhD, the first joint PhD astrophysics program.

Other activities

Meetings initiated by ICRA
Marcel Grossmann meetings

Writing down the equations of General Relativity was no doubt the result of Einstein's brilliant physical intuition, based from the mathematical point of view on the work of Gregorio Ricci Curbastro and Tullio Levi Civita of the University of Padua and the University of Rome "La Sapienza". Essential to this work was the intervention of Marcel Grossmann of the University of Zurich who was close to Einstein and who had a deep knowledge of the Italian school of geometry.
In order to promote this important collaboration between physics and mathematics, in celebration of that historic event, Remo Ruffini and Abdus Salam established in 1975 the Marcel Grossmann meetings (MG) on Recent Developments in Theoretical and Experimental General Relativity, Gravitation, and Relativistic Field Theories which take place every three years in different countries. MG1 and MG2 were held in 1975 and in 1979 in Trieste; MG3 in 1982 in Shanghai; MG4 in 1985 in Rome; MG5 in 1988 in Perth; MG6 in 1991 in Kyoto; MG7 in 1994 at Stanford; MG8 in 1997 in Jerusalem; MG9 in 2000 in Rome; MG10 in 2003 in Rio de Janeiro; MG11 in 2006 in Berlin; MG12 in 2009 in Paris; MG13 in 2012 in Stockholm; MG14 in 2015 in Rome.

Italian-Korean Meetings on Relativistic Astrophysics

The Italian-Korean Symposia on Relativistic Astrophysics is a series of biannual meetings organized alternatively in Italy and in Korea since 1987. It has been boosting exchange of information and collaborations between Italian and Korean astrophysicists on new and hot issues in the field of Relativistic Astrophysics. The symposia cover topics in astrophysics and cosmology, such as gamma ray bursts and compact stars, high energy cosmic rays, dark energy and dark matter, general relativity, black holes, and new physics related to cosmology.

William Fairbank Meetings on Relativistic Gravitational Experiments in Space

The First William Fairbank Meeting on was held at the University of Rome "La Sapienza," in 1990, under the auspices of ICRA with support from ASI (Italian Space Agency), ESA (European Space Agency), the Vatican Observatory, Stanford University and the University of Rome. Almost 80 physicists and engineers in widely diversified fields relativistic gravitation, space research, SQUID technology, large scale cryogenics, clock technology, laser and radar science and other fields - came together in the kinds of free technical exchange so characteristic of William Fairbank, in whose honor the meeting was held. The second meeting was held in Hong Kong and was devoted to relativistic gravitational experiments in space. The third meeting held in Rome and Pescara in 1998 was focused on the Lense-Thirring effect.

First William Fairbank Meeting, Rome, 10–14 September 1990, ICRA, University of Rome "La Sapienza" - ICRA Network, Pescara.

Second William Fairbank Meeting, December 13–16, 1993, Hong Kong

Third William Fairbank Meeting. The Lense-Thirring Effect, June 29 - July 4, 1998, ICRA, University of Rome "La Sapienza" - ICRA Network, Pescara.

The Galileo-Xu Guangqi meetings

The Galileo-Xu Guangqi meetings have been created in the name of Galileo and Xu Guangqi, the collaborator of Matteo Ricci (Ri Ma Dou), generally recognized for bringing to China the works of Euclid and Galileo and for his strong commitment to the process of modernization and scientific development of China. The 1st Galileo - Xu Guangqi Meeting was held in Shanghai, China in 2009. The 2nd Galileo - Xu Guangqi meeting took place in Hanbury Botanic Gardens (Ventimiglia, Italy) and Villa Ratti (Nice, France) in 2010. The 3rd and 4th Galileo - Xu Guangqi meetings were held in Beijing, China in 2011 and 2015, respectively.

ICRA Network Workshops
INW I: LXV of R. Giacconi, Rome and Castelgandolfo, October 24–26, 1997

INW II: The Chaotic Universe, Rome and Pescara, February 1–5, 1999

INW III: Electrodynamics and Magnetohydrodynamics around Black Holes, Rome and Pescara, July 12–24, 1999

INW IV: Science at new Millennium, UWA, March 10–14, 2000

INW VI: Time structures in Relativistic Astrophysics, Pescara, July 2–14, 2001

INW VIII: Step and General Relativity, Pescara, September 16–21, 2002

INW IX: Fermi and Astrophysics, Rome and Pescara, October 3–7, 2001

INW X: Black Holes, Gravitational Waves and Cosmology, Rome and Pescara, July 15–20, 2002

INW XV: Testing the Equivalence Principle on Ground and in Space, Rome and Pescara, Italy September 20–23, 2004

Publications
In addition to the proceedings of conferences several books have been published, in particular:

ICRA and G9 history
The history of the relativistic astrophysics group in the Department of Physics (Fisica) of the University of Rome "La Sapienza" led by Remo Ruffini, started with his appointment to a chair of theoretical physics there in 1978 is represented here.

Marcel Grossmann Awards 
Each meeting, one or two institutions and between two and six individual scientists are selected to receive the Marcel Grossmann Award. Each recipient is presented with a silver T. E. S. T. sculpture designed by artist A. Pierelli.

References

Astrophysics
International research institutes
International scientific organizations